Alan L. Rector is a Professor of  Medical Informatics in the Department of Computer Science at the University of Manchester in the UK.

Education
Rector received a Bachelor of Arts degree from Pomona College, a Doctor of Medicine (MD) degree from the University of Minnesota and a Ph.D from the University of Manchester in 1987.

Research
Rector's research specialty is clinical terminology, SNOMED, GRAIL, OpenGALEN, biomedical ontologies, Artificial Intelligence in medicine, the Web Ontology Language and the development of the semantic web. He presently leads the CO-ODE and HyOntUse projects developing user-oriented ontology development environments under the JISC and EPSRC Semantic Web and Autonomic Computing initiatives as well as the CLEF project, developing secure and ethical methods to collect live patient record data, under the MRC eScience initiative.

Rector has been a visiting senior scientist at Stanford University. He has been a consultant to the NHS Information Authority, the Mayo Clinic &  Hewlett Packard and Siemens Healthcare. He is a member of the Jisc Committee for the Support of Research, the National Cancer Research Institute Board for Bioinformatics, the Joint NHS/Higher Education Forum on Informatics, and the Board of the Academic Forum of the UK Institute for Health Informatics. Rector also serves on the board of HL7-UK, the main standards body for Healthcare Informatics and has been involved with the International World Wide Web Conference and the World Wide Web Consortium (W3C).

His research has been funded by the Engineering and Physical Sciences Research Council, the Medical Research Council and the Joint Information Systems Committee.

Awards
In 2003, he received the 1st British Computer Society Health Informatics Committee award for lifetime service to Health Informatics.

References

Alumni of the Victoria University of Manchester
People associated with the Department of Computer Science, University of Manchester
Health informaticians
University of Minnesota Medical School alumni
Academics of the University of Manchester
Year of birth missing (living people)
Living people
Semantic Web people
Pomona College alumni